Dante "Tex" Gill (April 2, 1930−January 8, 2003) was an American trans man gangster and massage parlor owner.

Biography
Gill was born on April 2, 1930, to parents Walter and Agnes.

Gill managed Spartacus Massage Parlor in McKees Rocks, the Japanese Meditation Temple, and the Taurean Models massage parlor. Authorities raided Spartacus in 1978, at which time Gill threw a birthday cake at an undercover state trooper.

Gill went to trial at federal court in 1984 for income tax fraud.

Gill was an expert equestrian, working as a blacksmith and riding teacher at Schenley Park's stable in his younger years.

In 1985, Gill was sent to prison for 13 years, released in 1987.

In popular culture
Scarlett Johansson planned to take on the role of Gill in the film Rub & Tug, but withdrew after widespread criticism as she is a cisgender woman.

References

1930 births
2003 deaths
American crime bosses
Transgender men
American brothel owners and madams
Businesspeople from Pittsburgh
LGBT people from Pennsylvania
20th-century American businesspeople
20th-century American LGBT people
21st-century American LGBT people